Euastacus spinifer  is a species of freshwater crayfish endemic to Australia that belongs to the family Parastacidae.

Appearance
Morphological variation is observed in Euastacus spinifer that originate in different river systems. They are mostly green with reddish-brown joints and bright spines.

Diet
Detritus forms the staple diet of the species but they may also eat small invertebrates and  tadpoles. They are also cannibalistic. They are also believed to be opportunistic omnivore.

Life cycle
Eggs are carried in the female Pleopods and hatch after an incubation period of 110–140 days. Hatch-lings stay with their parents until early summer. There are a class of "precious males" that mature at  length. There are slight variation in reproduction cycle between species in different river systems.

Size

Distribution
They are endemic to Australia.

Habitat
Creeks and estuaries are their usual habitats. Their habitats are usually shaded by vegetation.

Moulting
Moulting frequency of individuals in the species differ with size smaller individuals moult up to six times a year while larger individuals moult only once. Different sizes moult a different seasons temperature is believed to be the regulating force.

References

External links
 Sydney Spiny Crayfish video on Youtube

Fauna of New South Wales
Endemic fauna of Australia
Freshwater crustaceans of Australia
Crustaceans described in 1865
spinifer